Katie Underwood (born 23 December 1975) is an Australian singer-songwriter and meditation teacher. She is best known for being a member of Bardot, winners of the first Australian series of Popstars in 2000.

Since departing the group in 2001, her solo career has included numerous vocal appearances on dance tracks such as the Disco Montego Top 10 single "Beautiful", and dance act T-Funk single "Be Together".

Career

Music
In February 1999 in London, Underwood recorded a dance track with UK trance act Terra Ferma, releasing her first single "Don't Be Afraid" through Platipus Records in the UK. She also recorded three more tracks which were included on the Terra Ferma album, released in early 2000. After returning from the UK to Melbourne, Underwood began working with singer/songwriter Charlie Rooke (formerly of The Sharp) and they formed a jazz-swing band called Corduroy Lounge.

In October 1999, she auditioned for the TV show Popstars, making it through to the final five. As a result, she was selected to join the girl group Bardot. The group achieved instant success with the No. 1 hit "Poison" and its No. 1 debut album, headlined its own national tour and performed at the 2000 ARIA Awards in which it was nominated for three awards. Underwood travelled to New Zealand, Singapore, Taiwan and the UK, promoting with Bardot.

In early 2001, she decided to leave the group in pursuit of a role in the Harry M. Miller's production of Hair. Unfortunately for Underwood, the production fell through due to financial problems. Underwood later spoke of the deep depression she fell into as a result of what most people thought was a foolish career decision, despite the fact that Bardot's commercial success after her departure was muted. She subsequently turned the tables and made a successful comeback, earning respect from entertainment critics for her resilience.

Focusing on her passion for the clubbing scene and dance music, Underwood returned to the spotlight in May 2002, collaborating with Australian dance duo Disco Montego, resulting in the Top 10 ARIA hit "Beautiful" and its follow-up "Magic". She released her first solo single "Danger" in September 2003 which peaked at No. 33 on the singles chart and took a two-year break in which no music was released.

In June 2006, Underwood re-emerged with dance act T-Funk on the track "Be Together", topping the ARIA Club charts for five consecutive weeks. It peaked at No. 31 on the mainstream singles chart. The music video of this track directed by Bangladeshi born Australian director Zayed Rizwan AKA Silk was nominated in the best music video category in Aria Awards 2007.

In November 2009, Underwood self-released her debut studio album called Ain't Nobody's Baby.

During the 2010s, Underwood stepped out of the public spotlight and only made rare musical appearances in Melbourne. During this period she received multiple invites to appear as a contestant on The Voice; to humour the producers Underwood eventually accepted the invite but before reaching the blind auditions she refused to sign the contract that would have put her on the show.

In April 2020, to commemorate the 20th anniversary of the release of their debut single "Poison", Underwood and Bardot bandmates Tiffani Wood and Belinda Chapple reunited remotely online to perform the song. In September 2021, it was announced that Underwood and Chapple would professionally reunite as a duo under the name Ka'Bel, with their debut single "Broken Hearted" released on 15 October 2021.

Acting
In 2002, Underwood appeared on the series Undercover Angels, a reality TV show which aimed to give a helping hand to people in need.

In 2007, Underwood confirmed her plans to star in a new musical called Dark Angels, based on the story of a bisexual burlesque star, and a lesbian film called Submerge. She said she would have no problem with the leading roles because of her own lesbian experimentation. Dark Angels played in Melbourne during 2007. Submerge, directed by Sophie O'Connor, was due to be shot in January 2009.

In 2009, Underwood toured in a new musical, David Tydd's Valentino (about Rudolph Valentino), with fellow Bardot member Tiffani Wood and Normie Rowe.

Personal life 
Born in Adelaide, South Australia, Underwood sang in a girls choir, and later studied Maths and Computer Science at University of Adelaide. After three years at university she dropped out and moved to Melbourne.

In June 2007, The Sydney Morning Herald printed an interview with Underwood about her bisexuality. 

In July 2011, Underwood gave birth to twin daughters. She currently lives in Melbourne and is a meditation teacher and remedial massage therapist.

Discography

Albums
 Ain't Nobody's Baby (November 2009)

Singles

References

External links 
 Official Site
 
 Empire Records
 Studio 52

1975 births
Living people
APRA Award winners
Australian dance musicians
Australian women singer-songwriters
Bardot (Australian band) members
Bisexual musicians
Bisexual women
Australian LGBT singers
Musicians from Adelaide
Singers from Melbourne
21st-century Australian singers
21st-century Australian women singers